Wade's Bridge (originally known as Tay Bridge) is five-arch bridge crossing the River Tay at Aberfeldy, Perth and Kinross, Scotland. A Category A listed structure built in 1733,  to a design by William Adam, it carries the pedestrian and vehicle traffic of Poplar Avenue.Tay Bridge – Historic Environment Scotland Erected for the Board of Ordnance, to the order of Lieutenant General George Wade, its original purpose was as a military road linking the garrisons at Ruthven, Fort George, Fort Augustus and Fort William. 

The stone was quarried, cut and tooled at nearby Bolfracks. In 1932, two tablets with copies of Wade's original inscriptions were let into the stonework of two obelisk plinths; one in English and one in Latin. These state that the bridge was begun in April 1733 and finished by January; however, this is not strictly true, as General Wade stopped work for the winter, leaving the bridge without parapets over the side arches. These were added the following year.

See also
List of listed buildings in Aberfeldy, Perth and Kinross

References

External links
General Wade's Roads – Historic Environment Scotland
Aberfeldy Conservation Area Appraisal – Perth and Kinross Council, November 2008

Category A listed buildings in Perth and Kinross
Listed buildings in Aberfeldy
Listed bridges in Scotland
Bridges across the River Tay
Bridges in Perth and Kinross
Bridges completed in 1733
1733 establishments in Scotland